Patrick Edgeworth (born 25 December 1932 in London) is an English stage and screenwriter.

Early life 
Edgeworth grew up in England. In 1969, he arrived in Australia to be best man at the wedding of his pianist brother Ron and Judith Durham, former lead singer of The Seekers. He remained in Australia.

Television 
Edgeworth began working as an actor for film and television, mostly in the police dramas made by Crawford Productions. In 1971, after submitting a script to them, he was offered a position as writer on Matlock Police, which he initially declined, as it would have meant forgoing acting. However, when he compared his recent earnings as an actor to what he was being offered as a staff writer, he opted for writing. After writing eighteen episodes in eighteen months at Crawfords he left, and with co-producer Russell Hagg, formed a production company, Homestead Films. He wrote 11 of the 13 episodes of Cash and Company and seven of the follow up series, Tandarra. Both shows sold to TV networks world-wide. He also wrote and co-produced the film Raw Deal (1977).

Theatre 
Edgeworth's first stage play Boswell for the Defence (1989) was a hit for Leo McKern in London's West End and throughout Australia.

A second play Love Julie starring Millicent Martin and Anne Charleston toured England to rave reviews. This was followed by productions in the U.S. and South Africa. Retitled Girl Talk for Australia it had a hugely successful seven-month tour with Jacki Weaver.

His comedy/drama play Amorous Intrigue concerns the life and times of Restoration playwright Aphra Behn.

His musical, Georgy Girl, opened in December 2015 at Her Majesty's Theatre in Melbourne and toured to Sydney and Perth, for producers Richard East and Dennis Smith.

Select credits

Television
The Long Arm (1970) - actor
Homicide - actor, writer
Matlock Police - actor and writer
Division 4 - actor
Cash and Company (1975) - writer, producer
Tandarra (1976) - writer, producer
Against the Wind (1978) - actor
Special Squad (1984) - writer
Chances (1991) - writer
Newlyweds (1993–94) - writer
Ship to Shore (1993–94) - writer
Blue Heelers - writer
Snowy River: The McGregor Saga - writer
State Coroner (1997) - writer
Neighbours (1999) - writer

Feature films
Raw Deal (1977) - writer, producer
BMX Bandits (1983) - writer
Cool Change (1986) - writer
Driving Force (1989) - writer
A Sting in the Tale (1989) - actor, writer
Bad Blood (2017) - based on his screenplay

Theatre
Boswell for the Defence (1989) - writer
Love Julie - writer
Girl Talk (2000) - writer
Georgy Girl - the Seekers Musical (2015) - creator and writer

References

External links
Patrick Edgeworth at IMDb
Patrick Edgeworth at Ausstage
 
 https://web.archive.org/web/20110708033438/http://dumdumland-patrick.blogspot.com/2009/06/chapter-one.html

1932 births
Living people
English male screenwriters
English screenwriters
Writers from London
Writers from Melbourne